Wesley Kareroa (born 15 November 1967) is a Cook Islands politician and member of the Cook Islands Parliament.  He is a member of the Cook Islands Democratic Party.

Kareroa was born on Rarotonga and educated at Mangaia Primary School and Mangaia College. He worked as an agent for Air Rarotonga. He was first elected to Parliament in the 2014 Cook Islands general election. After the election he was reportedly offered a ministerial position by Prime Minister Henry Puna in exchange for supporting him in the House, but refused. He was re-elected in the 2018 election.

In February 2020 he was appointed Democratic Party spokesperson on National Superannuation and Parliamentary Services.

He was re-elected at the 2022 Cook Islands general election.

References

Living people
1967 births
People from Rarotonga
Members of the Parliament of the Cook Islands
Democratic Party (Cook Islands) politicians